Pontecorvo is a town and comune in the province of Frosinone, Lazio, Italy. Its population is c. 13,200.

History 
The village lies under Rocca Guglielma, a medieval fortification perched on an inaccessible spur. Its name derives from the pons curvus, "curved bridge", that may still be seen spanning the Liri in the center of the town that grew around the bridgehead in the course of the Middle Ages. The curve of the bridge was intended to divert timbers that might strike its piers during floods. The folk etymology of corvo, "crow", symbol of the "black monks", the Benedictines of the abbey of Monte Cassino, within whose secular territory, the Terra Sancti Benedicti, Pontecorvo lay, is displayed in the town's modern coat-of-arms, which represents a crow surmounting a curved bridge.

In Roman times the agricultural region was governed from Aquinum, the modern Aquino. Some Roman remains have been retrieved from a villa site at Sant'Oliva. The medieval commune dates from 860, when Rodoaldo, the Lombard gastaldo of Aquino, erected the first version of the walled fortification on the rocca, intended to guard the bridgehead from Saracen intruders coming up the Liri. The castle's chapel seems to have been dedicated to Saint Bartholomew; on the ruins of the Lombard castello was erected the earliest Cathedral of San Bartolomeo of which the campanile was a rebuilding of the castellan's tower.  Two medieval quarters developed, Cività within the walls and Pastine in the meadows between the city walls and the river. The little bridgehead settlement formed part of the County of Capua; there in 866 Louis II, Holy Roman Emperor, set up camp at Pontecorvo in campaigns against the Saracens. In 960 Atenulf succeeded in attaching Pontecorvo to his gastaldate of Aquino; at his death his lands were divided into a county of Aquino and a county of Pontecorvo.

In 1065 the Normans conquered the region and attached Pontecorvo to the Norman county of Gaeta, but the abbot of Monte Cassino purchased it in 1105, and maintained a precarious hold on it for over four centuries. The first communal statute, among the earliest in the Kingdom of Naples, was granted in 1190, signalling a new era of civic self-confidence in a period in which Pontecorvo was briefly conquered and ruled by Roger II of Sicily, was claimed by the papacy, and was sacked by Charles of Anjou. During the Western Schism, Pontecorvo allied with antipope Clement VII in opposition to the local power of Monte Cassino.

Although just within the territory of the Kingdom of Naples, the town was an exclave of the Papal States from 1463, when the comune placed itself under papal jurisdiction, until it was captured by the French army in the Napoleonic Wars. After having been proclaimed King of Italy in 1805, Napoleon created the Principality of Pontecorvo, a principality for his General Jean Baptiste Bernadotte, who would become King Charles XIV of Sweden and III of Norway. The principality was nominally sovereign, but the Prince did have to take an oath to the King. It was short-lived, however, and in 1815 the town was ceded back to the Papal States. In 1820 the 'Republic' of Pontecorvo seceded from the Papal States, but Papal rule was restored in March 1821. In 1860 it joined Benevento, the other southern Italian papal enclave, in being united with the new Kingdom of Italy.

The town was destroyed during World War II, and rebuilt in a modern style.

References

External links 
 Napoleonic Titles and Heraldry
 Portale di Pontecorvo
(La Ciociaria) Pontecorvo e la sua storia